Denmark was represented by Birthe Kjær, with the song "Vi maler byen rød", at the 1989 Eurovision Song Contest, which took place on 6 May in Lausanne, Switzerland. "Vi maler byen rød" was chosen as the Danish entry at the Dansk Melodi Grand Prix on 25 March, a victory for Kjær after three runner-up finishes in DMGP earlier in the 1980s.

Before Eurovision

Dansk Melodi Grand Prix 1989 
The final was held at the Bella Center in Copenhagen, hosted Jarl de Friis-Mikkelsen. Ten songs took part, with the winner being chosen by nine regional juries. Other participants included 1983 Danish representative Gry Johansen and the 2000 contest winner Jørgen Olsen.

At Eurovision 
On the night of the final Kjær performed 12th in the running order, following  and preceding . At the close of voting "Vi maler byen rød" had received 111 points, placing Denmark third of the 22 entries, the country's second consecutive third-place finish. The Danish jury awarded its 12 points to Sweden.

Voting

References 

1989
Countries in the Eurovision Song Contest 1989
Eurovision